In the Forest of the Dreaming Dead is the debut studio album by the Swedish melodic death metal band Unanimated.

Track listing

 The original No Fashion Records (NFR004) release has an incorrect track listing.

Personnel
 Peter Stjärnvind - drums
 Jonas Mellberg - guitar
 Micke Jansson - vocals
 Daniel Lofthagen - bass
 Jojje Bohlin - guitar
 Jocke Westman - keyboards

Additional personnel
Johan Edlund - vocals on and lyrics for "Cold Northern Breeze"
Daniel L - artwork
Richard Cabeza - lyrics
Stefan Roos - photography
Micke Lindh - engineering, mixing
Anders Olsson - engineering, mixing

Charts

References

1993 debut albums
Unanimated albums